The Synechococcaceae are a family of cyanobacteria.

References

Synechococcales
Cyanobacteria families